2023 FIH Indoor Hockey World Cup may refer to:

2023 Men's FIH Indoor Hockey World Cup
2023 Women's FIH Indoor Hockey World Cup